Liselotte Johansson  (born 21 July 1970) is a Swedish freestyle skier. She was born in Berg Municipality. She competed at the 1994 Winter Olympics, in women's aerials, and also at the 1998 Winter Olympics and 2002 Winter Olympics.

References

External links 
 

1970 births
People from Berg Municipality
Living people
Swedish female freestyle skiers
Olympic freestyle skiers of Sweden
Freestyle skiers at the 1994 Winter Olympics
Freestyle skiers at the 1998 Winter Olympics
Freestyle skiers at the 2002 Winter Olympics
Sportspeople from Jämtland County
20th-century Swedish women